Peshawar District is a district in Peshawar Division of Khyber Pakhtunkhwa province in Pakistan. It is located about 160 km west of the Pakistan's capital Islamabad. The district headquarter is Peshawar, which is also the capital of Khyber Paktunkhwa.

History
Peshawar is located in geo-strategically important location and has an enriched history. This district and city has seen the rise and fall of many civilizations. It was once the center of Gandhara and has subsequently been ruled by Persians, Greeks, Buddhists, Kushans, Afghans, Mughals, Marathas, Sikhs and the British. The original district of Peshawar was a district of the North-West Frontier Province of British India.

After independence in 1947, the old Peshawar District became Peshawar Division containing the current districts of Peshawar District, Charsadda District and Nowshera District. In July 1988, the former Charsadda tehsil was separated and became Charsadda District while former Nowshera tehsil became Nowshera District in 1990. Under the latest revision of Pakistan's administrative structure, promulgated in 2001, Peshawar was also given the status of a city district.

Demographics

Population 
At the time of the 2017 census the district had a population of 4,331,959, of which 2,229,681 were males and 2,101,649 females. The population of the district over the years is shown in the table below.

Rural population was 2,362,136 (54.53%) while the urban population was 1,969,823 (45.47%). The literacy rate was 55.01% - the male literacy rate was 68.78% while the female literacy rate was 40.47%.

Language

Religion

1897 Report 
According to 1897 records during British Raj, most people living in Peshawar valley were Pathans and belonged to an agriculture community but there was also large Punjabi and Hindkowan communities living in the valley; all three ethnolinguistic groups religiously belonged to Islam, Hinduism and Sikhism. Most people in Peshawar city spoke and understood Urdu. Elite belonging to small towns such as big feudal Khan families, traders and almost all of Hindus also spoke Urdu. Persian was also spoken by elites of Peshawar city and by traders from Kabul. Majority of the population of the district especially the agriculturists and Pathans only spoke Pashto. 

92% of the total population of Peshawar valley practiced religion of Islam and remainder 8% practiced Hinduism, Sikhism and other religions. People belonging to these minority religions primarily lived in major cities such as Peshawar, Charsadda (now in Charsadda District) and Hoti (now in Mardan District) and mostly in cantonment areas of these cities. 97% of the population living in rural towns practiced Islam.

Education 

Peshawar District has universities for many disciplines starting from Humanities, General Sciences, Sciences, Engineering Sciences, Medical Sciences, Agriculture Sciences and Management Sciences. Currently, there are 9 Medical Colleges of which 2 in public sector and 7 in private sector, which are recognised and approved by Pakistan medical and dental association plus a medical university, Khyber Medical University in the district.

The first public sector university University of Peshawar was established in 1950. In 1980, University of Engineering and Technology, Peshawar was established while University of Agriculture, Peshawar was inaugurated in 1981. The first private sector university CECOS University of IT and Emerging Sciences, started working in 1986.Soon after another university by name of Brains Institute and post graduate college was established. In 1995, a public sector management institute named as Institute of Management Sciences was established, which became degree awarding institute in 2005.

In 2001, four (4) new private sector universities started working in Peshawar. The name of these universities are Qurtuba University, Sarhad University of Science and IT, Fast University, Peshawar Campus and City University of Science and IT. Gandhara University was established in 2002 while Abasyn University was created in 2007. 

In 2007, Government of Khyber Pakhtunkhwa established first public sector medical university, Khyber Medical University and the district also has 2 public sector medical colleges, one is Khyber Medical College and one for girls named as Khyber Girls Medical College.

The first women university was established in 2012, when Shaheed Benazir Bhutto Women University started working while private sector IQRA National University was also established in 2012.

Apart  from excellent range of universities, Peshawar district also has huge numbers of further education (Post School) institutes both in public and private sectors. The most renowned are Islamia College Peshawar, which was established in 1913 and was upgraded to become university in 2008 and Edwardes College Peshawar, which is the oldest of all institutions in the district started functioning in 1900.

State of Education in Peshawar 
According to Pakistan District Education Rankings 2017 published by Alif Ailaan, Peshawar ranks 4th in Pakistan in terms of primary school infrastructure while it ranks 52nd in Pakistan for middle school infrastructure. In terms of education score, Peshawar ranks 64th in Pakistan with having a relatively low retention score. Beyond Primary Readiness in Peshawar is on the lower side as it ranks 62nd in Pakistan.

The main issues reported in Taleem Do! App for district Peshawar are overcrowded class rooms and lack of class rooms in schools.

Girls’ education is also one of the most reported issues in the app, with main focus on lesser number of Girls schools and also schools located at long distances.

Issues of lack of teachers, non-availability of science labs and lack of High Schools were also reported.

Issues regarding the high fee collections in private schools was also reported on multiple occasions.

Administration 
The district Peshawar is administrated by Deputy commissioner who is chief administrative, land revenue officer and the representative of government in district. DC is assisted by Additional Deputy commissioner and Assistant commissioner. Peshawar is divided into seven tehsil which are further divided into village council (rural areas) and neighbourhood council (urban areas). There are total 357 councils in peshawar district out of which 130 are neighbourhood councils and 277 are village councils.
Each tehsil has its own government knwon as tehsil municipal administration having an elected tehsil council and tehsil chairman except Peshawar city tehsil which is administrated by a city local government which is composed of an elected city council and an elected mayor.

Tehsil of Peshawar District 
 Peshawar City Tehsil
 Shah Alam Tehsil
 Mathra Tehsil
 Chamkani Tehsil
 Badabher Tehsil
 Peshtakhara Tehsil 
 Hassan Khel Tehsil (FR Peshawar)

Neighbourhood and Village Councils of Peshawar District
1. Peshawar City Tehsil
Village Councils = 9 Neighbourhood Councils =121 	  Total Councils = 130.
2. Badhaber tehsil
Village Councils = 37 Neighbourhood Councils = 0 	  Total Councils = 37. 
3. Chamkani tehsil
Village Councils = 42 Neighbourhood Councils = 4 	  Total Councils = 46. 
4. Shah Alam tehsil
Village Councils = 41 Neighbourhood Councils = 2 	  Total Councils = 43. 
5. Pishtakhara tehsil
Village Councils = 34 Neighbourhood Councils = 2 	  Total Councils = 36. 
6. Mathra tehsil
Village Councils = 53 Neighbourhood Councils = 1 	  Total Councils = 54.
7. Hassan Khel
Village Councils = 11 Neighbourhood Councils = 0	  Total Councils = 11.

Each Village and Neighborhood Council is composed of 7 Members which are as given below

1. Chairman of VC or NC 

2. Vice Chairman of VC or NC 

3. General Councilor 

4. Women Councilor

5. Youth Councilor

6. Worker and Peasant Councilor

7. Minority Councilor

These members are elected by voter directly through local elections

Provincial Assembly Seats 
According to new delimitation list made by election commission of Pakistan the district Peshawar is represented in provincial assembly through 14 constituencies. Currently  all seats are empty because assembly is dissolved and new elections are going to happen soon.

National Assembly Seats 
The district is represented in the Pakistan National Assembly by five (5) members.

See also 
Union Councils of District Peshawar

References

Bibliography 

 
Districts of Khyber Pakhtunkhwa